This is a list of Spanish football transfers for the January sale in the 2013–14 season of La Liga. Only moves from La Liga are listed.

The winter transfer window has opened on 1 January 2014, although a few transfers took place prior to that date. The window will close at midnight on 1 February 2014. Players without a club can join one at any time, either during or in between transfer windows. Clubs below La Liga level can also sign players on loan at any time. If need be, clubs can sign a goalkeeper on an emergency loan, if all others are unavailable.

Winter 2014 La Liga transfer window

References

Transfers
Spanish
2013–14